Glapwell is a village and civil parish on the A617 road in the Bolsover District of north-east Derbyshire, between the towns of Chesterfield (7 miles) and Mansfield (5 miles) and Bolsover (3 miles to the north). With 1,467 residents, increasing to 1,503 at the 2011 Census, Glapwell is situated atop a steep hill, adjoining the village of Bramley Vale, which lies at the bottom of the hill.

History
This village is listed in the Domesday Book. In 1086, the book notes that Serb holds this from William Peverel.
 
"In Clapwell, Liefric had one carucate of land to the geld. There is land for as two ploughs.  There eight villans have 6 ploughs... Serb now holds it." 
Glapwell colliery closed in the 1970s and the site is owned by a private company manufacturing industrial fencing. There is no overall dominant industry in the area, with most of the jobs being out of the village.

Amenities
The village has a local shop/post office and one pub/restaurant, the Young Vanish (the name derived from that of a 19th-century champion racehorse). The Plug and Feathers (formerly Ma Hubbards and originally the Glapwell Hotel, known by many locals as "The New Un"), near the former station at the bottom of Glapwell Hill, is now being refurbished for the new owner, Starbucks.

The social club on Rowthorne Lane closed in December 2011 and the site has been redeveloped for housing. Another longstanding landmark that also disappeared in 2011 was Staleys, the local garage. Glapwell Garden Centre stands on the site of the former Glapwell Hall, the former residence of the Hallowes and now extinct Jackson families.

Nearby is Hardwick Hall, an Elizabethan mansion in a commanding position high on the same hill as Glapwell, operated by the National Trust. Access to the grounds and Hall was possible via Rowthorne Lane in Glapwell, but this was stopped in the early 1990s to reduce traffic in the residential area of the village. Access is now only possible via Mill Lane under the motorway bridge M1 motorway near the village of Heath; Mill Lane joins the old coaching road approach to the mansion from Stainsby Mill, a working watermill restored by the National Trust.

The local football team Glapwell F.C. play their home games at Hall Corner in the north of the village. The cricket team, Glapwell Colliery Cricket Club, play their home games at Park Avenue.

See also 
List of places in Derbyshire
Listed buildings in Glapwell

References

Bolsover District
Villages in Derbyshire